Jesse Lowe (March 11, 1814 – April 3, 1868) was the first mayor of Omaha, Nebraska, serving for one year from March 5, 1857 to March 2, 1858. An important real estate agent in the early city, Lowe is credited with naming the city after the Omaha Tribe.

Biography
Lowe was born in Raleigh, North Carolina, and along with his brother Enos, the family soon afterward moved to the Indiana Territory, settling in Monroe County. Lowe's parents were strict Quakers. Jesse receiving his education at Bloomington College. After studying law and interning with Tilghman Howard in Indiana, Lowe decided not to become a lawyer, instead serving in the commissary of a Missouri volunteer regiment under Sterling Price. He was promoted to Paymaster in the U.S. Army served during the entire Mexican–American War. In 1853 he moved to Council Bluffs, Iowa where his brother was the city's tax collector.

On July 3, 1853, Lowe crossed the Missouri River with his brother Enos into Indian Territory, estimating the land across from Council Bluffs was going to become a great city. Jesse Lowe staked out a quarter-section and later bought three other quarter-sections, totaling . Within a week he established the "Oak Grove Farm."

Lowe was a founding member of the Omaha Claim Club in 1854, and assisted Alfred D. Jones in the first survey of the city. In 1855 he built the first bank building in Omaha at 12th and Farnam Streets in present-day Downtown Omaha. Lowe also invested in the Council Bluffs and Nebraska Ferry Company, which was the foremost ferry company in Omaha for more than 25 years.

Lowe was married to Sophia Hoppin on July 3, 1856, in Burlington, New Jersey. They had four children, including Frederick Brown Lowe, Charlotte Augusta Lowe, Jesse Lowe Jr., and Tilghman Howard Lowe.

Jesse Lowe died in 1868, in Omaha. He is buried at the Forest Lawn Memorial Park in Omaha.

Legacy
Lowe's legacy is readily apparent in the city of Omaha. The Jesse Lowe Conference Room, named in his honor, was located on the third floor of the Civic Center.

See also

 History of Omaha
 Founding figures of Omaha, Nebraska

References

External links
 Historic portrait
 Grave marker

1814 births
1868 deaths
Businesspeople from Omaha, Nebraska
Politicians from Raleigh, North Carolina
Mayors of Omaha, Nebraska
Burials at Prospect Hill Cemetery (North Omaha, Nebraska)
19th-century American politicians
Businesspeople from Raleigh, North Carolina